This is a list of Malaysian football transfers for the 2013 first transfer window. Moves featuring Malaysia Super League, Malaysia Premier League and Malaysia FAM Cup club are listed.

2013 First Transfers 
All clubs without a flag are Malaysian. Otherwise it will be stated.

Transfers

Loans

Unattached Players

Notes

References

2013
Tranfers
Malaysia